Rabbi Avrohom Chaim Oppenheim (1796? – 1824?) was a rabbi at Pécs, Hungary, where he died at the age of 28, before 1825.

He was the author of Har Ebel (Lemberg, 1824), ritual regulations on visiting the sick, mourning customs, etc., and of a treatise entitled Nishmas Chayim (Dyhernfurth, 1829), on the immortality of the soul, both of which were published by his relative Simon Oppenheim, dayan in Budapest.

References 

18th-century rabbis
19th-century Hungarian rabbis
Haredi rabbis in Europe
Hungarian Orthodox rabbis
People from Pécs
1790s births
1820s deaths
Year of birth uncertain
Year of death uncertain